Luis Silva is a Paralympic swimmer. His achievements include winning three silver medals and one bronze medal at the 2000 Summer Paralympics.

References

Year of birth missing (living people)
Living people
People from Bagé
Paralympic swimmers of Brazil
Swimmers at the 2000 Summer Paralympics
Swimmers at the 2004 Summer Paralympics
Swimmers at the 2008 Summer Paralympics
Medalists at the 2000 Summer Paralympics
Medalists at the 2004 Summer Paralympics
Medalists at the 2008 Summer Paralympics
Medalists at the World Para Swimming Championships
Medalists at the 2003 Parapan American Games
Brazilian male butterfly swimmers
S6-classified Paralympic swimmers
Sportspeople from Rio Grande do Sul
21st-century Brazilian people